Agama boulengeri, also known commonly as Boulenger's agama, is a species of lizard in the family Agamidae. The species is native to western Africa.

Etymology
The specific name, boulengeri, is in honor of Belgian-born British herpetologist George Albert Boulenger.

Geographic range
A. boulengeri is found in Mali and Mauritania.

Habitat
The preferred natural habitats of A. boulengeri are rocky areas and wetlands.

Description
A. boulengeri is a small lizard. Dorsally, it is grayish brown, with yellowish specks. Ventrally, it is yellowish.

Behavior
A. boulengeri is terrestrial and diurnal.

Reproduction
A. boulengeri is oviparous.

References

Further reading
Lambert MRK, Mullié WC (1998). "Sexual dichromatism of Agama boulengeri observed in Southern Mauritania". British Herpetological Society Bulletin (65): 42–44.
Lataste F (1886). "Description d'un saurien nouveau du Haut Sénégal ". Le Naturaliste 8: 212–213. (Agama boulengeri, new species). (in French).
Trape J-F, Trape S, Chirio L (2012). Lézards, crocodiles et tortues d'Afrique occidentale et du Sahara. Paris: IRD Orstom. 503 pp. . (in French).
Vale CG, Tarroso P, Campos JC, Gonçalves DV, Brito JC (2012). "Distribution, suitable areas and conservation status of the Boulenger's agama (Agama boulengeri Lataste, 1886)". Amphibia-Reptilia 33 (3–4): 526–532.

Agama (genus)
Reptiles described in 1886
Taxa named by Fernand Lataste